SS Doric was a British ocean liner operated by White Star Line. She was put into service in 1883. Built by the Harland and Wolff shipyards in Belfast, she was the sister ship of the Ionic which was put into service a few months earlier. Although the original purpose of the construction of the two ships was not known with certainty, both began their careers chartered by the New Zealand Shipping Co. which operated them on the route from London to Wellington.

As early as 1885, the Doric, like her sister ship and the Coptic, was assigned to the same route, but this time for the joint service provided by the White Star Line and the Shaw, Savill & Albion Line. The ship carried out this mission without experiencing any major incident, until she was overhauled in 1895 in order to modernize it. Deemed unnecessary on the New Zealand route, the Doric was chartered by the Occidental and Oriental Steamship Company between Hong Kong and San Francisco.

It was in 1906 that the Doric made her last crossing under this contract, while the O&O gradually withdrew from the market. She was then sold to the Pacific Mail Steamship Company which employed her on the same route, this time under the name of Asia. It was within the framework of this service that the ship ran aground on rocks on 23 April 1911. Her passengers came out unharmed from the accident, but the ship was quickly looted and set on fire by local fishermen.

History

Construction and service to New Zealand
The ship was constructed by Harland and Wolff in Belfast and was launched in 1883. These were enlarged versions of two ships commissioned in 1881, the Arabic and the Coptic. The ship was constructed of steel, a first for the ship building company, whose previous designs had been constructed only in iron. The vessel was the first White Star Line ship to bear the name Doric, with a later vessel built in 1923 also sharing the name. The Doric was launched on 10 March 1883; with her sister ship twin, launched two months earlier. She is one of the first ships whose machines were built by the shipyards themselves. These were, until then, built by outside workshops. On the following 4 July, the ship left Belfast for London, making a stopover at Holyhead to embark Thomas Henry Ismay, president of the White Star Line, and several dignitaries accompanying him to visit the ship.

Ismay's plans when he ordered these ships were unknown, but it was likely that he originally planned the project for the route to New Zealand. At that time, in fact, two companies, the Shaw, Savill Line and the Albion Line had just merged to form the Shaw, Savill & Albion Line to compete with the New Zealand Shipping Company, which was preparing to have five ships delivered brand new. The route from London to Wellington therefore seems poised to prosper. Following the amalgamation in November 1882, the owners of the Shaw, Savill & Albion Line entered into negotiations with Ismay to plan a joint service, benefiting from the experience of the White Star Line. An agreement was quickly formed between the two companies

The Doric then continued her charter contract throughout 1884, and joined the joint service on 6 January 1885, on the Wellington route, passing on the outward journey through Tenerife, Cape Town and Tanzania, and to return via Cape Horn, Montevideo and Rio de Janeiro. Crews were provided by White Star, but ships were managed by Shaw, Savill and Albion. The crossings were calm and uneventful.

In 1893, the White Star acquired a new ship on the route, the Gothic. The Doric and the Coptic were then no longer useful on this route where the traffic was down.

Service on the Pacific and fate
In May 1895, the Doric was returned to Harland & Wolff shipyards where her facilities were improved, and its machines changed to the more economical alternative triple expansion machines, which increased her tonnage and speed. In 1896, Doric was again transferred, this time to the Joint White Star and Occidental and Oriental Steamship Company service running between San Francisco and Hong Kong. The New York Times reported on 6 July 1902 that Doric had arrived in San Francisco with a particularly large cargo of 2,693 tons, which included the largest ever shipment of opium, at the time, of 33,210 pounds, and 129,492 chests of tea.

Doric left San Francisco for her last White Star and Occidental & Oriental voyage on 8 August 1906. In 1906 Doric was sold to the Pacific Mail Steamship Company for £50,000, who renamed her Asia. Still assigned to the same route, the ship made her first crossing on 11 June 1907 under her new colors, after a rapid overhaul. On 23 April 1911 Doric ran aground in foggy conditions and was wrecked near Taichow Islands, Wenzhou, South China. Once all of the crew and passengers had been safely rescued, the ship was looted by local fishermen who subsequently burnt the remains of the vessel.

Legacy
The ship in Rudyard Kipling's poem "McAndrew's Hymn" was inspired by the Doric; in a letter to illustrator Howard Pyle he wrote "-but it may help you a little to know that the ship "McAndrew’s Hymn" belongs to is the old Doric, once an Atlantic White Star I think, and now a Shaw, Savill, Albion boat running to New Zealand via the Cape of Good Hope and home round the horn..."

Characteristics
The Doric was a slightly larger version of the Arabic and the Coptic, measuring 134 meters long by 13.5 meters wide; she differed from the Ionic only by her slightly lower gross tonnage of 4,744 tons. However, this was increased to 4,784 tons after an overhaul. Like the two previous ships, she was designed to carry cargo in good quantity, as well as 70 first-class passengers. She could also embark 900 emigrants, and had a refrigerated hold intended for the transport of meat.

Externally, the ship was, like all ships of the time built for the White Star Line, an elongated ship, provided with a fairly low funnel in the colors of the company (brown ocher surmounted by a black cuff). The funnel was surrounded by four masts that could carry sails. The ship was mainly propelled by steam, her machines being among the first to be built by the Harland & Wolff shipyards after those of the Ionic. They were alternative compound machines operating a propeller capable of propelling the ship at 13 knots. In 1895, they were replaced by triple expansion machines, which were more modern and economical, and allowed her to reach a speed of 14 knots.

References

Bibliography

Passenger ships of the United Kingdom
Ships of the White Star Line
1883 ships
Ships built in Belfast
Ocean liners of the United Kingdom
Ships built by Harland and Wolff
History of San Francisco
Maritime incidents in 1911
Shipwrecks of China
Shipwrecks in the East China Sea
Ships sunk with no fatalities
April 1911 events